Vash-Yazy (Waşyaźı) is a rural locality (a village) in Askinsky District, Bashkortostan, Russia. The population was 16 as of 2010. There is 1 street.

Geography 
Vash-Yazy is located 49 km north of Askino (the district's administrative centre) by road. Kshlau-Yelga is the nearest rural locality.

References 

Rural localities in Askinsky District